Millstream Brewing is a small American brewery founded in 1985 by Carroll F. Zuber and brothers James Roemig and Dennis Roemig in Amana Colonies Iowa.

History
Millstream Brewing Company was established in the fall of 1985 in The Amana Colonies by locals Carrol Zuber and brothers James and Dennis Roemig. Joseph Pickett designed the brewery and created the original recipes. Originally Millstream's only products consisted of the Millstream Lager and  the Schild Brau Amber. In 2001 three employees formed a partnership and purchased the brewery. Since that time Millstream has continued to grow and expand their product line, now offering almost 15 different beers throughout the year and two types of Soda.

Beers
Schild Brau Amber
German Pilsner
Windmill Wheat
Back Road Stout
Iowa Pale Ale
John's Generations White Ale
Oktoberfest
Heferweissen
Schokolade Bock
Rock Bock

Sodas
Root Beer
 Old Time Cream Soda
 Orange Cream Soda

Awards

Schild Brau

Millstream Wheat

German Pilsner

Back Road Stout

Location
Millstream Brewing Company is located in Amana, Iowa.

References

https://millstreambrewing.com/beer/

External links
Millstream Brewing
RateBeer
Amana Colonies

Beer brewing companies based in Iowa